Best Actor is the name of an award which is presented by various film, television and theatre organizations, festivals, and people's awards to leading actors in a film, television series, television film or play.

The term most often refers to the Academy Award for Best Actor, which was first awarded on May 16, 1929 by the Academy of Motion Picture Arts and Sciences (AMPAS) at the Academy Awards to Emil Jannings for his role of Grand Duke Sergius Alexander in The Last Command and August Schilling in The Way of All Flesh. In theatre, it was first awarded on April 6, 1947 by the American Theatre Wing and The Broadway League at the Tony Awards to José Ferrer for his role of Cyrano de Bergerac in Cyrano de Bergerac and to Fredric March for his role of Clinton Jones in Years Ago. In television, it was first awarded on January 23, 1951 by Academy of Television Arts & Sciences at the Primetime Emmy Awards to Alan Young for his role of himself in The Alan Young Show. In a film festival, presented as the Volpi Cup, it was first awarded between August 1–20, 1934 by the Venice Film Festival to Wallace Beery for his role of Pancho Villa in Viva Villa!

Film awards 
 AACTA Award for Best Actor in a Leading Role
 AACTA International Award for Best Actor
 AVN Award for Best Actor
 Academy Award for Best Actor
Annecy Italian Film Festival for Best Actor Award
 Asian Film Award for Best Actor
 Asianet Film Award for Best Actor
 BAFTA Award for Best Actor in a Leading Role
 Babisas Award for Best Actor
 Bachsas Award for Best Actor
 Bangladesh National Film Award for Best Actor
 Bavarian Film Awards (Best Acting)
 Bengal Film Journalists' Association – Best Actor Award
 BET Award for Best Actor & Actress
 BIFA Award for Best Performance by an Actor in a British Independent Film
 Black Reel Award for Best Actor
 Bodil Award for Best Actor in a Leading Role
 Bollywood Movie Award – Best Actor
 Boston Society of Film Critics Award for Best Actor
CIFF Best Actor Award
Canadian Screen Award for Best Actor
Cannes Film Festival Best Actor Award
 César Award for Best Actor
 Chicago Film Critics Association Award for Best Actor
 CineMAA Awards for Best Actor
Citra Award for Best Actor
 CJFB Performance Award for Best Actor
 Critics' Choice Movie Award for Best Actor
 Critics' Choice Movie Award for Best Actor in an Action Movie
 Critics' Choice Movie Award for Best Actor in a Comedy
 Dallas–Fort Worth Film Critics Association Award for Best Actor
 David di Donatello for Best Actor
 Edda Award for Best Actor or Actress
 Empire Award for Best Actor
 Empire Award for Best British Actor
 European Film Award for Best Actor
 FAMAS Award for Best Actor
 Filmfare Award for Best Actor - Hindi
 Filmfare Award for Best Actor – Kannada
 Filmfare Award for Best Actor – Malayalam
 Filmfare Award for Best Actor – Tamil
 Filmfare Award for Best Actor – Telugu
 Florida Film Critics Circle Award for Best Actor
 Genie Award for Best Performance by a Foreign Actor
 GIFA Best Actor Award
 GIFA Critics Best Actor Award
 Golden Arena for Best Actor (Pula Film Festival)
 Golden Calf for Best Actor (Netherlands Film Festival)
Golden Eagle Award for Best Actor (China)
 Golden Eagle Award for Best Actor (Russia)
 Golden Globe Award for Best Actor – Motion Picture Drama
 Golden Globe Award for Best Actor – Motion Picture Musical or Comedy
Golden Goblet Award for Best Actor (Shanghai International Film Festival)
 Golden Horse Award for Best Leading Actor
 Golden Rooster Award for Best Actor
 Goya Award for Best Actor
 Goya Award for Best New Actor
 Guldbagge Award for Best Actor in a Leading Role
 Hong Kong Film Award for Best Actor
 Hundred Flowers Award for Best Actor
 IIFA Award for Best Actor
 Independent Spirit Award for Best Male Lead
 ITFA Best Actor Award
 ITFA Best New Actor Award
 Japan Academy Prize for Outstanding Performance by an Actor in a Leading Role
 Kerala State Film Award for Best Actor
 London Film Critics' Circle Award for Actor of the Year
 Los Angeles Film Critics Association Award for Best Actor
 Lumières Award for Best Actor
 Lux Style Award for Best Film Actor
 Meril Prothom Alo Award for Best Actor
 Nandi Award for Best Actor
 Nastro d'Argento for Best Actor
 Nigar Award for Best Actor
 National Board of Review Award for Best Actor
 National Film Award for Best Actor
 National Society of Film Critics Award for Best Actor
 NAACP Image Award for Outstanding Actor in a Motion Picture
 New York Film Critics Circle Award for Best Actor
 Online Film Critics Society Award for Best Actor
 Polish Academy Award for Best Actor
 Robert Award for Best Actor in a Leading Role
 San Diego Film Critics Society Award for Best Actor
 San Francisco Film Critics Circle Award for Best Actor
 Santosham Best Actor Award
 Sarasaviya Best Actor Award
 Satellite Award for Best Actor – Motion Picture
 Saturn Award for Best Actor
 Screen Actors Guild Award for Outstanding Performance by a Male Actor in a Leading Role
 Screen Award for Best Actor
 Screen Award for Best Actor (Critics)
 Screen Award for Best Actor (Popular Choice)
 Shanghai Film Critics Award for Best Actor
SIIMA Award for Best Actor (Telugu)
Silver Bear for Best Actor (Berlin International Film Festival)
Silver Hugo Award for Best Actor (Chicago International Film Festival)
 St. Louis Gateway Film Critics Association Award for Best Actor
 Stardust Award for Best Actor
 Stardust Award for Best Actor in a Comedy or Romance
 Stardust Award for Best Actor in a Drama
 Stardust Award for Best Actor in a Thriller or Action
 Tamil Nadu State Film Award for Best Actor
Tokyo International Film Festival Best Actor Award
 Toronto Film Critics Association Award for Best Actor
 Vancouver Film Critics Circle Award for Best Actor
 Vancouver Film Critics Circle Award for Best Actor in a Canadian Film
Vietnam Film Festival Best Actor Award
 Vijay Award for Best Actor
Volpi Cup for Best Actor (Venice Film Festival)
 Washington D.C. Area Film Critics Association Award for Best Actor
 Zee Cine Award for Best Actor – Male
 Zee Cine Critics Award for Best Actor – Male

Television awards 
 AACTA Award for Best Lead Actor in a Television Drama
 Golden Bell Award for Best Actor in a Miniseries or Television Film
 Golden Bell Award for Best Actor
 Black Reel Award for Best Actor: T.V. Movie/Cable
 British Academy Television Award for Best Actor
 British Soap Award for Best Actor
 Daytime Emmy Award for Outstanding Lead Actor in a Drama Series
 Gemini Award for Best Performance by an Actor in a Continuing Leading Dramatic Role
Golden Calf for Best Acting in a Television Drama (Pula Film Festival)
 Golden Globe Award for Best Actor – Miniseries or Television Film
 Golden Globe Award for Best Actor – Television Series Drama
 Golden Globe Award for Best Actor – Television Series Musical or Comedy
 Hum Award for Best Actor
 Hum Award for Best Actor Popular
 Lux Style Award for Best TV Actor
 NAACP Image Award for Outstanding Actor in a Daytime Drama Series
 NAACP Image Award for Outstanding Actor in a Drama Series
 NAACP Image Award for Outstanding Actor in a Television Movie, Mini-Series or Dramatic Special
 Primetime Emmy Award for Outstanding Lead Actor in a Comedy Series
 Primetime Emmy Award for Outstanding Lead Actor in a Drama Series
 Primetime Emmy Award for Outstanding Lead Actor in a Miniseries or a Movie
 Satellite Award for Best Actor – Miniseries or Television Film
 Satellite Award for Best Actor – Television Series Drama
 Satellite Award for Best Actor – Television Series Musical or Comedy
 Saturn Award for Best Actor on Television
 Screen Actors Guild Award for Outstanding Performance by a Male Actor in a Comedy Series
 Screen Actors Guild Award for Outstanding Performance by a Male Actor in a Drama Series
 Screen Actors Guild Award for Outstanding Performance by a Male Actor in a Miniseries or Television Movie
 Sun Kudumbam Best Actor Award
 TVB Anniversary Award for Best Actor

Theatre awards 
 Evening Standard Theatre Award for Best Actor
 Helpmann Award for Best Male Actor in a Musical
 Helpmann Award for Best Male Actor in a Play
 Helpmann Award for Best Male Performer in an Opera
 Laurence Olivier Award for Actor of the Year in a New Play
 Laurence Olivier Award for Actor of the Year in a Revival
 Laurence Olivier Award for Best Actor
 Laurence Olivier Award for Best Actor in a Musical
 Molière Award for Best Actor
 NAACP Theatre Award for Best Lead Male – Equity
 NAACP Theatre Award for Best Lead Male – Local
 Tony Award for Best Actor in a Play
 Tony Award for Best Actor in a Musical

See also 

 Lists of acting awards
 List of film awards for lead actress 
 List of television awards for Best Actress
 List of film awards for lead actor
 List of television awards for Best Actor

References